Alexander Moncrieff is the name of:

Alexander Bain Moncrieff (1845–1928), Irish-born engineer, active in Australia
Alexander Moncrieff, Lord Moncrieff (1870–1949), Scottish lawyer and judge
Alexander Moncrieff (minister) from John Howie (biographer)
Alexander Moncrieff (Secession minister), Secession minister